Revue is a German language weekly illustrated magazine published in Luxembourg.

History and profile
Reveu was established in 1945. It was published by an independent publisher and was owned by a family. In 2000 the weekly was sold to Editpress.

The magazine provides news on TV programs and famous people including the members of Grand Ducal family.

References

External links
 

1945 establishments in Luxembourg
Celebrity magazines
German-language magazines
German-language mass media in Luxembourg
Magazines established in 1945
News magazines published in Europe
Television magazines
Weekly magazines